Tom Never was a Native American born on the island of Nantucket circa 1640. His birth name was originally very long and was shortened to Tom Never by a group of leading British settlers who partnered with him to commercially export whale oil from Sachem Wanackmamack, located in the southeast corner of the island and subsequently known as Tom Never's Head. From 1672 to 1692, oil produced and sold by Native Americans (referred to as "Indian oil") was exempt from export taxes, giving "Tom Never's Whale Oil" a significant competitive advantage. In later years the apostrophe was dropped and that part of Nantucket is now known as Tom Nevers Head or simply Tom Nevers.

References
 http://www.yesterdaysisland.com/2008/features/tomnever.php ″Tom Never's Ghost″ by Jack Warner / Quatrefoil Publishing

1640 births
Year of death unknown
Native American people